Porinju Mariam Jose is a 2019 Indian Malayalam-language period action thriller film directed by Joshiy and written by Abhilash N. Chandran. Joju George, Nyla Usha, and Chemban Vinod Jose portrays the titular characters, and also features Vijayaraghavan, Rahul Madhav, and Sudhi Koppa in supporting roles. The original soundtrack of the film was composed by Jakes Bejoy. The story is loosely based on events that occurred in 1980s-1990s Thrissur.

The film was released in theatres across India on 23 August 2019 to positive reviews. It turned out to be a commercial success. It was the fifth Malayalam film of 2019 after Lucifer, Kumbalangi Nights, Uyare and Virus to successfully complete 100 days in theaters.

Plot 
In 1965, Porinju Joy and Puthanpally Jose are best friends in their youth, and Jose tries to persuade Porinju to confess his love to Alappattu Mariyam Varghese, but a then timid Porinju could not. One day at school, a boy bullies Mariyam and a fight ensues between Porinju and the boy. Since the boy was from an influential family and Porinju was from a poor family, the teacher punishes Porinju alone, striking him repeatedly. Porinju and Jose shout at the teacher and leave the school never to come back. Mariyam openly condemns the teachers attitude in front of the class, for which she is scolded.

In 1985, Porinju is known as Kattalan (hunter, literally 'man of the forest') Porinju, now a village butcher and henchman of Iype Muthalali, a wealthy and powerful real estate dealer at the locality. Porinju is very close to Iype, but Iype's sons do not like their relationship. Jose is an aspiring disco-dancer and performs his moves at the annual Perunnal of the church. Mariyam is now a money lender. The three of them still keep a close relationship, even though Mariyam has now become critical of Porinju and Jose for their troublesome life. Porinju now often openly woos Mariyam, which she ignores.

On a perunnal night, a procession is going on in front of Mariyam's house, Jose dances along with Mariyam. Meanwhile, Iype's grandson Prince gropes Mariyam, she humiliates him in front of public. Jose beats Prince and drives him away back to his house. As the procession advances later towards Iype's house, Prince tells his uncles about the incident and together they beat Jose. Porinju breaks up the fight, but Prince still beats him, leading to him and Jose beating up Prince and the uncles. Iype, though seeing his sons getting beaten up, ignores it.

In a flashback, Mariyam was about to elope with Porinju but her father Varghese ties a rope around his neck and threatens to hang from a tree if she ran away. However, he loses his grip and accidentally hangs himself. Due to this, she lives alone without marrying Porinju.

A year later, as the Perunnal nears, Prince arranges hitmen to kill Porinju and Jose. Jose gets killed while at a movie theater. For this, Porinju takes revenge and hacks Prince to death in front of the Perunnal procession. Prince's uncles arrange other hitmen to kill Porinju, but Porinju kills them and scares the uncles away, sparing them. Meanwhile, Mariyam arranges to get bail for Porinju in case he goes to court for the killings.

Iype's household, including Iype himself, is mourning for Prince's death. The Perunnal procession passes by the house, and he comes out to greet them. Porinju also arrives and the two dance together happily. However, Iype takes out a hidden knife and stabs Porinju multiple times, saying that his grandson's life matters to him, but not Porinju's. The bystanders surround Iype, but Porinju snatches the knife and tells everyone to back off, and orders Iype to go back to his own house. Mariyam arrives, and he dies in her arms.

In the end, Mariyam stands in front of Porinju's gravestone. The stone also has her name inscribed on it, with a vacant death date. Mariyam then watches a fight going on between some children while they are playing football, and she smiles.

Cast 

Joju George as Kattalan Porinju
Nyla Usha as Alappattu Mariyam Varghese 
Chemban Vinod Jose as Puthanpali Jose
Vijayaraghavan as Iype Muthalali
Rahul Madhav as Prince
Sudhi Koppa as Puthanpally Babu
Salim Kumar as Beedi Joy (Porinju's father)
TG Ravi as Puthanpalli Anthony (Jose's father)
Sarasa Balussery as Jose's mother
Nandhu as Alappattu Varghese (Mariyam's father)
Swasika as Lizy Jose
Malavika Menon as Lilly
Parvathi T. as Susanna (Prince's mother)
Sadhika Venugopal as Alice
Remya Panickar  as Sherly
I. M. Vijayan as Kuriyachira George
Disney James as Stephen
Sadiq as Muyalan Devassi
Jayaraj Warrier as Tinto
Anil Nedumangad as Raphael
Kalabhavan Niyas as Varkey
Abhishek Raveendran as Anto
Nisthar Sait as SI Avaran
E A Rajendran as School Principal
Sinoj Varghese as Manja
Nanda Kishore as Father Irumbanakkal
Jayaprakash Kuloor as Advocate Veerabhadra Menon
Amal Shah as Young Porinju
Davia Mary Ben as Minimol
Govind V. Pai as Young Jose
Meenakshi Dinesh as Young Mariyam

Production 
Abhilash N. Chandran has penned the story and screenplay. Manju Warrier has been initially approached to do the role of Mariyam, but she backed out due to date issues. The role went to Nyla Usha which became a break for her and career best. Later due to schedule conflicts, Biju Menon was replaced by Joju George while Chemban Vinod Jose was earlier confirmed.

Release
The film was released in India and Gulf Cooperation Council territories on 23 August 2019.

Box office
The film grossed $309,267 from 39 screens in the opening weekend (23 – 25 August) in the United Arab Emirates and $541,287 in three weeks. It earned $8,133 (₹5.77 lakh) from 7 screens in the opening weekend (20 – 22 September) in the United States.  It was the 5th film of 2019 after Lucifer, Kumbalangi Nights, Uyare and Virus to successfully complete 100 days in theaters.

Critical reception
The New Indian Express rated 3.5 in a scale of 5 and called it "an intense, high-voltage thriller", and that "the storytelling is not exactly fresh, but the actors and the cathartic violence make Joshiy's latest film compelling". Sify rated 3.5 in a scale of 5, but called it an "average masala entertainer" and said the film "may be far from perfect but is well packaged and is genuinely engaging", but situations are mostly predictable and at times, unconvincing. But praised the performances of Joju, Nyla and Jose. Manorama Online rated 3 out of 5 and wrote: "Joshiy engineers the twin shades of noir and romance, deftly interchanging them at the right moments, for a smooth glide of the narration. DOP by Ajay David Kachappilly and the brilliant music by Jakes Bejoy  each other and elevate the movie to several notches above".

Rating 3 out of 5 stars, The News Minute called it a "lovely drama" and "Joshiy makes it a very enjoyable movie to watch, but the second half does not keep up with the neatly built-up first half". The Times of India also rated 3 out of 5 and said the film has good story, cast and reasonable performances (particularly Jose's), but "Porinju Mariyam Jose gets tad bit predictable. But one may watch it for the spectacle at offer by the narrative genius and the unrequited love story in the sidelines". Deccan Chronicle rated 3 out of 5 stars and stated that "in spite of a slightly stretched storytelling and a predictive second half, PMJ is a good watch".

The Hindu wrote that in the film, "one gets to see a filmmaker who has been closely watching the changing rules of the game, and trying to adapt", but the film is "fairly predictable, and at times tame ... but what makes it watchable are the array of characters, and the performances, especially of Chemban and Joju. They are all colourfully written, and there is a lot of life to them". HuffPost had the opinion that the film may have worked better in the '80s", "the talented cast is let down by a clichéd narrative and a director stuck on his old-school filmmaking skills". Firstpost rated 1.75 in 5, saying that the "basic story is interesting, and there is a lot this film could have been", but with a "weak writing of its leads, it is unsurprising that Porinju Mariam Jose fails to be an involved, emotionally engrossing narrative".

References

External links
 

2010s Malayalam-language films
2019 films
Films directed by Joshiy
Films about Christianity
Christianity in India
Christianity in Kerala
Films set in 1985
Films set in Kerala
Churches in Thrissur
Films shot in Thrissur
Films scored by Jakes Bejoy